Tensaw is an unincorporated community in Baldwin County, Alabama, United States.  It is part of the Daphne–Fairhope–Foley Micropolitan Statistical Area and is the home of historic Fort Mims.

The name Tensaw is derived from the historic indigenous Taensa people. A post office operated under the name Tensaw from 1807 to 1953.

Gallery
Below are structures that were located in Tensaw that were recorded in the Historic American Buildings Survey:

References

Unincorporated communities in Baldwin County, Alabama
Unincorporated communities in Alabama
Alabama placenames of Native American origin